W30EB-D is a television station in Kingston, Pennsylvania broadcasting Daystar programming. The station broadcasts to the surrounding area of Luzerne County on digital UHF channel 30 (virtual channel 43).

Digital television

Digital channels
The signal from W30EB-D is multiplexed, dominantly Christianity based programming

References

External links
 

30EB-D
Television channels and stations established in 1991
Low-power television stations in the United States
1991 establishments in Pennsylvania
Christian Television Network affiliates